Bakrabad (also Romanized as Bakrābād and Bekrābād; also known as Bākyāb, Bekiab, and Kyaraly) is a village in Bakrabad Rural District of the Central District of Varzaqan County, East Azerbaijan province, Iran. At the 2006 National Census, its population was 605 in 135 households. The following census in 2011 counted 668 people in 192 households. The latest census in 2016 showed a population of 717 people in 230 households; it was the largest village in its rural district.

References 

Varzaqan County

Populated places in East Azerbaijan Province

Populated places in Varzaqan County